Susie Steps Out is a 1946 American comedy film directed by Reginald Le Borg, written by Elwood Ullman and Fred Freiberger, and starring David Bruce, Cleatus Caldwell, Nita Hunter, Howard Freeman, Grady Sutton and Margaret Dumont. It was released on December 13, 1946 by United Artists.

Plot

Jeffrey Westcott is a popular singer represented by Mr. Starr's advertising agency. He is attracted to Clara Russell, a secretary at the agency.

Clara and her 15-year-old sister Susie are concerned because their father, a cello player, is unable to work. Susie lies that she is 19 and lands a job singing in a nightclub. Jeffrey goes to the club with Starr sees that the girl is underage, though he is unaware that Clara is her sister. He takes her home, where Clara finds him and mistakenly accuses him of improper behavior.

Starr's wife believes that he is having an affair with his secretary and has Clara is fired. Susie confronts her and explains all.

Cast 
David Bruce as Jeffrey Westcott
Cleatus Caldwell as Clara Russell
Nita Hunter as Susie Russell
Howard Freeman as Mr. Starr
Grady Sutton as Dixon
Margaret Dumont as Mrs. Starr
Percival Vivian as Papa Russell
Joseph J. Greene as Bailey 
John Berkes as Wilkins
Harry Barris as Ned
Emmett Vogan as Dr. Hennings
Syd Saylor as Biegelman
Shelley Winters as Band Singer

References

External links 
 

1946 films
American black-and-white films
Films directed by Reginald Le Borg
United Artists films
1946 comedy films
American comedy films
1940s English-language films
1940s American films